In the final round of matches of the final round of Asian qualification for the 1994 FIFA World Cup, Japan and Iraq drew 2–2 in Doha, Qatar. If Japan had won the match, they would have qualified for the World Cup for the first time. Instead, Japan finished third in their group, allowing their arch-rivals South Korea to qualify instead. The Japanese refer to the match as the "Agony of Doha", whereas South Koreans, because the country's national football team only qualified in the final minutes of this match, refers to it as the "Miracle of Doha".

The failure to qualify for the World Cup, and the dramatic way in which it happened, caused great disappointment for Japanese fans. Football had become very popular in Japan with the launch of the professional J.League earlier that year and the team had never been that close to qualifying for the World Cup.

Before the match
Six nations (Japan, South Korea, Saudi Arabia, Iraq, Iran, and North Korea) competed in the final round of Asian qualification for two places at the 1994 World Cup in the United States. The six finalists played each other in Doha, Qatar in a round robin format of matches that were held between 15 and 28 October 1993. After four rounds of matches and with two points for a victory (instead of three) for each team, the standings were as follows:

(Win = 2 points, draw = 1 point, loss = 0 points; tie broken by goal difference)

In the 4th round of matches, Japan defeated South Korea 1–0 taking first place in the standings going into the final match. Although just one point separated the 1st and 5th spots and only North Korea had been eliminated, Japan would have qualified for the finals with a win regardless of any other results. Japan still would have qualified with a draw as long as either South Korea or Saudi Arabia failed to win its last match and Iran did not defeat Saudi Arabia by more than four goals.

Match

Summary
The match was held on 28 October 1993, simultaneously with the rest of the fifth round of matches, South Korea vs North Korea and Saudi Arabia vs Iran, held in other venues in Doha.

Japan opened the scoring from a first-half goal by Kazuyoshi Miura, but Iraq's Radhi Shenaishil scored the equaliser just prior to half-time. Japan again took the lead with a goal from Masashi Nakayama. The 2–1 score stood as the match approached the 90th minute.

The matches at the other venues had ended earlier, with South Korea beating North Korea 3–0 and Saudi Arabia beating Iran 4–3. This meant Japan would have to hold onto the score in order to qualify for the World Cup, with the combination of results eliminating South Korea.

However, Japan gave the ball up to Iraq, and just after the match entered stoppage time, Jaffar Omran scored a goal from a corner kick, tying the score at 2–2. The referee blew the final whistle and finished the match moments after this, eliminating both teams.

Details

Results
After the final round of matches, the standings looked as follows:

Saudi Arabia took first place with their 4–3 victory over Iran. Japan and South Korea were even on points, but South Korea held the goal difference advantage after the three-goal victory over North Korea, winning the tie-breaker.

South Korea won the match against Iran (3–0), but tied in subsequent matches against Iraq (2–2) and Saudi Arabia (1–1) and lost a match against Japan (0–1). Had Japan won this match against Iraq, South Korea would have been eliminated even if they won the match against North Korea held on the same day. But as Japan and Iraq tied in the last minute, South Korea qualified and the match was dubbed a "miracle" by South Korean media.

Dutch coach Hans Ooft was fired weeks after the match and the elimination from the tournament effectively ended World Cup aspirations for the majority of the team, most notably legendary midfielder Ruy Ramos. Only two Japanese players who appeared in the match, Nakayama and Masami Ihara, would go on to appear in Japan's 1998 FIFA World Cup squad.

However, the disheartening result would serve as an inspiration in future World Cup qualification campaigns and to this day, the Agony of Doha is invoked by the Japanese media and fans.

Aftermath
After missing the 1994 edition, Japan eventually qualified for the 1998 FIFA World Cup, before hosting the 2002 FIFA World Cup along with their rival South Korea. The South Koreans dramatically beat Portugal, Italy, and Spain and ended in 4th place while Japan was eliminated in the 16th Round. Both teams lost to Turkey. It was the first time for both teams to reach the knockout phase.

They also qualified for every single FIFA World Cup edition since then, reaching the Round of 16 in three editions: in 2010, 2018 and 2022. However, in each of these occasions, Japan got eliminated in dramatic fashion. They first lost to Paraguay in 2010 in a penalty shoot-out, and then lost to Belgium in 2018 by 3-2 after conceding in the fourth minute of stoppage time after a Belgian counter-attack following a Japanese corner kick; the Japanese were leading 2–0 until the 69th minute. In 2022, Japan got knocked out again in the Round of 16, this time falling to Croatia in another penalty shoot-out that ensued after a 1-1 draw.

For Iraq, this failure is just one part of the much larger World Cup drought. In comparison to increasing success of the Japanese side, Iraq has repeatedly missed the opportunity to qualify for every World Cup. Iraq has only qualified for the 1986 edition. In addition, sectarian conflicts and internal turmoil have prevented Iraq from achieving a greater status in Asian football. Since this game as well, Iraq has never beaten Japan in a competitive match, be it friendlies or major competitions since 1982, the last time Iraq won. Iraq also suffered a losing streak to Japan since this game, starting with a 1–4 defeat in 2000 AFC Asian Cup (which was Japan's first win over Iraq), until 2017 when Iraq drew Japan 1–1 to end the country's losing streak.

Japan in neutral site qualifiers
Beginning with qualifiers for the 1998 World Cup, AFC has used home-and-away round robin format for its final qualifying round, instead of the single-venue format used in 1993. However, in two of the subsequent World Cup qualifying campaigns, Japan have determined its World Cup fate in neutral site matches.

In 1997, Japan and Iran finished second in their respective qualifying groups for the 1998 World Cup and met in the third-place match on 16 November 1997 in Johor Bahru, Malaysia. The match would decide the third and last automatic qualifying spot for Asian teams and the loser would face Oceania's representative Australia in a two-legged play-off. Unlike the match four years before, Japan fell behind in the second half, but scored a late equaliser and eventually won 3–2 through a golden goal in extra time, earning the nation its ticket to France.

On 8 June 2005, Japan defeated North Korea 2–0 to qualify for the 2006 World Cup in Germany. Although this match was scheduled as a home match for North Korea, it was moved to Bangkok, Thailand and held behind closed doors as a punishment for crowd violence in a previous match held in Pyongyang.

Notes

References

External links
 Iraqi Football Website
 History of Iraq National Team
Agony amid drama in Doha on FIFA.com
The Rising Sun Soccer News: Japanese National Team History: The Oft Era 

1993 in Asian football
AFC
Japan v Iraq
1994
1993 in Japanese football
1993
1993
Iraq–Japan relations
Iraq–South Korea relations
Japan–Qatar relations
Japan–South Korea relations
Japan
Qual
October 1993 sports events in Asia
1993
Japan–South Korea football rivalry